Ryan Syaffiq is a Singaporean footballer who had played for Geylang International as a midfielder.

He started playing in the S.League for Young Lions FC in 2016.

Club career

Young Lions FC
He was included in the Young Lions FC team for the 2017 SEA Games, then he was recruited in the Young Lions FC for the 2017 season.

International career

The FAS called-up him in the Singapore U21 team for the friendly matches against Bahrain U21 and China U21.

Career statistics 

Update 25 Sept 2019

References

Singaporean footballers
Singapore Premier League players
1997 births
Living people
Association football midfielders
Young Lions FC players
Geylang International FC players
Singapore youth international footballers